

K
 KABX - Kaber Company, Canadian Resource Distribution, Inc.
 KACX - Kaiser Aluminum and Chemical Corporation
 KAIX - Rinker Materials Corporation
 KAMX - Kamen, Inc.
 KARX - Hamilton Elevators
 KBSR - Kankakee, Beaverville and Southern Railroad
 KBSZ - Kankakee, Beaverville and Southern Railroad
 KCCX - Kennecott Utah Copper Corporation
 KCDX - Eastman Kodak Company
 KCGX - Kaiser Cement Corporation, Southdown, Inc.
 KCIX - ARCO Chemical Company, Nova Chemicals, Inc.
 KCLX - Kansas City Power and Light Company
 KCMO - Kansas City, Mexico & Orient
 KCMX - Kidd Creek Mines, Ltd.
 KCNW - Kelley's Creek and Northwestern Railroad
 KCPX - Kemira Chemicals Canada, Inc.
 KCRX - Kootenay Central Rail Services, Ltd.
 KCS  - Kansas City Southern Railway
 KCSM - Kansas City Southern de Mexico
 KCSU - Kansas City Southern Railway
 KCSZ - Kansas City Southern Railway
 KCT  - Kansas City Terminal Railway
 KCTV - KCT Railway
 KCWB - Kansas City Westport Belt
 KCWX - Kimberly-Clark of Canada, Ltd.
 KDCX - Eastman Chemical Canada, Inc.
 KDEX - GLNX Corporation
 KE   - Kansas Eastern Railroad
 KEBX - Ronald L. Boothman Remainder Trust
 KELX - Kellogg Company
 KENN - Kennecott Company Railroad
 KENX - KENX Associates
 KET - Kennewick Terminal Railway
 KEWH - Kewash Railroad
 KEYX - Keywell Corporation
 KFGX - Knauf Fiber Glass, GmbH
 KFMX - Oils Unlimited
 KFPX - Koppers Company, Inc.
 KFR  - Kettle Falls International Railway
 KFTX - J and J Railcar Leasing, LLC
 KGCX - Koppers Company, Inc., INDSPEC Chemical Corporation
 KGFX - Kingsford Company
 KGLX - Commonwealth Edison Company
 KGRX - Kasgro Rail Corporation
 KIIX - Koppers Industries, Inc.
 KJR  - Kiski Junction Railroad 
 KJRY - Keokuk Junction Railway
 KKLU - K Line
 KKLZ - K Line
 KKRR - Knox and Kane Railroad
 KKRX - Kaskaskia Regional Port District Railroad
 KKTU - Kerr Steamship K Line
 KLCU - IBJ Leasing Company, Ltd.
 KLL  - Klickitat Log and Lumber, J. Neils, St. Regis Paper Co.
 KLSC - Kalamazoo, Lake Shore and Chicago Railway
 KLSX - Kerford Limestone Company
 KM   - Kansas and Missouri Railway and Terminal Company
 KMCU - Mitsui O.S.K. Lines, Ltd.
 KMCX - Kerr-Mcgee Coal Corporation
 KMEU - K Line
 KMFX - Kaolin Mushroom Farms, Inc.
 KMTU - Hyundai Merchant Marine (America), Inc.
 KMTX - Kinder Morgan, Inc.
 KMTZ - Hyundai Merchant Marine (America), Inc.
 KMUX - Kershaw Manufacturing Company
 KNC  - Kingcome Navigation
 KNDX - Golden State Metals, Inc., KND Rail Services, Inc.
 KNLU - Nedlloyd Lines
 KNOR - Klamath Northern Railway
 KNOX - Philips Metals, Inc.
 KNWA - Kanawha River Railroad
 KO   - Kansas and Oklahoma Railroad
 KOAX - Coca-Cola USA a division of the Coca-Cola Company
 KOG  - Kansas, Oklahoma and Gulf Railway; Missouri Pacific Railroad; Union Pacific Railroad
 KPCX - Koppers Company, Inc., Koppers Industries, Inc.
 KPCZ - K and P Cartage Company
 KPGX - Kentucky Processing Company
 KPLU - K Line
 KPLX - Koppel, Inc., Western Resources, Inc.
 KPPX - KRATON Polymers US, LLC
 KPR  - Kelowna Pacific Railway, Ltd.
 KPRR - Kodak Park Railroad
 KPRX - Kauai Plantation Railway
 KPXX - Progress Rail Services Corporation
 KRDX - KRDX Company
 KRIX - GE Rail Services Corporation
 KRL  - Kasgro Rail Lines
 KRPX - Associated Electric Cooperative, Inc.
 KRR  - Kiamichi Railroad
 KRSX - Kurguz Enterprises, Inc. (Kurguz Railway Services)
 KRT - Kanawha River Terminal
 KSCU - Korea Shipping Corporation
 KSCZ - Korea Shipping Corporation
 KSMX - Kosmos Cement Company, Inc.
 KSPX - K+S Potash Canada GP
 KSRY - Kosciusko and Southwestern Railway
 KSW  - Kansas and Oklahoma Railroad
 KT   - Kentucky and Tennessee Railway
 KTR  - Kendallville Terminal Railway
 KTTX - Trailer Train Company, TTX Company
 KTX  - ACF Industries, Inc.
 KUCX - Kentucky Utilities Company
 KVR  - Kern Valley Railroad
 KWCU - World Container Leasing, Inc.
 KWT  - K.W.T. Railway
 KWTR - Keota Washington Transportation Company
 KWUX - Utility Power Corporation, Siemens Westinghouse Power Corporation
 KXHR - Knoxville and Holston River Railroad
 KYLE - Kyle Railroad
 KYLU - NYK Line
 KYRX - Progress Rail Services Corporation

K